Epidesmia perfabricata is a moth of the  family Geometridae. It is found in Australia.

The wingspan is about 35 mm.

References

Moths of Australia
Oenochrominae
Moths described in 1861